Minervarya marathi is a species of frog native to Maharashtra, India. They live near areas of water like paddy fields and also grasslands. The species was discovered by researchers from the Zoological Survey of India and Savitribai Phule Pune University.

Etymology 
The frog is named after the local language, Marathi.

References 

Amphibians described in 2019
Endemic fauna of India
Frogs of India
marathi